The Benthophilinae are a subfamily of gobies endemic to the Ponto-Caspian region (including the Marmara, Black, Azov, Caspian, and Aral Seas). The subfamily includes about 50 species. The representatives of the subfamily have fused pelvic fins and elongated dorsal and anal fins. They are distinguished from the closely related subfamily Gobiinae by the absence of a swimbladder in adults and location of the uppermost rays of the pectoral fins within the fin membrane.

The Catalog of Fishes still considers these fishes as belonging to the subfamily Gobiinae.

Systematics of the subfamily
 Tribe Benthophilini
 Anatirostrum
 Benthophiloides
 Benthophilus (type genus)
 Caspiosoma
 Tribe Neogobiini
 Neogobius (type genus)
 Tribe Ponticolini
 Babka
 Mesogobius
 Ponticola (type genus)
 Proterorhinus

References

External links
Neogobiin research at the University of Toledo, Ohio
Systematics of the Neogobiin Gobies Research project at U Toledo

 
Gobiidae